The James Henry House is a historic residence in St. Petersburg, Florida, United States, that is listed on the National Register of Historic Places.

Description
The house is located at 950 12th Street North and was constructed in 1905 by James and Lydia Henry.

It was added to the National Register of Historic Places on April 16, 2013.

See also

 National Register of Historic Places listings in Pinellas County, Florida

References

External links

National Register of Historic Places in Pinellas County, Florida
Houses in St. Petersburg, Florida
Houses completed in 1905
1905 establishments in Florida